Laddie Be Good is a 1928 American silent comedy Western film directed by Bennett Cohen and starring Bill Cody, Rose Blossom and George Bunny.

Cast
 Bill Cody as himself 
 Rose Blossom as Ruth Jones 
 George Bunny as Pierpont Jones 
 Henry Hebert as John Norton 
 Fred Gamble as Henry Cody

References

External links
 

1928 films
1920s Western (genre) comedy films
Films directed by Bennett Cohen
American black-and-white films
Pathé Exchange films
1928 comedy films
Silent American Western (genre) comedy films
1920s English-language films
1920s American films